Poplar Hill may refer to:

 Poplar Hill First Nation, Ontario
 Poplar Hill (Cynthiana, Kentucky), a National Register of Historic Places listing in Harrison County, Kentucky
 Poplar Hill (Aberdeen, Maryland)
 Poplar Hill Mansion Salisbury, Maryland
 Poplar Hill (Glen Cove, New York)
 Poplar Hill (Hillsborough, North Carolina)
 Poplar Hill (Hamilton County, New York)
 Poplar Hill (Blaine, Tennessee)
 Poplar Hill (Smithfield, Virginia)

Other 
 His Lordship's Kindness, estate in Clinton, Maryland, also known as Poplar Hill.